Bundesstraße 27 or B27 is a German federal road. It connects Blankenburg am Harz with Rafz in Switzerland.

Route

The Bundesstraße 27 crosses the following states and towns (north to south):

 Saxony-Anhalt: Blankenburg am Harz
 Lower Saxony: Braunlage, Göttingen
 Hesse: Sontra, Bad Hersfeld, Fulda
 Bavaria: Hammelburg, Würzburg
 Baden-Württemberg: Tauberbischofsheim, Heilbronn, Ludwigsburg, Stuttgart, Tübingen, Rottweil, Donaueschingen, Jestetten
The B27 is interrupted in two places: between Würzburg and Tauberbischofsheim, where it has been replaced by the motorways A3 and A81, and between Randen and Jestetten, where it crosses through Switzerland.
The part south of Stuttgart follows the Schweizer Straße (Suisse road), a chaussee from 18th century.

See also 
List of federal highways in Germany

027
Roads in Saxony-Anhalt
Roads in Lower Saxony
Roads in Hesse
Roads in Bavaria
Roads in Baden-Württemberg